Gas-rich meteorites are meteorites with high levels of primordial gases, such as helium, neon, argon, krypton, xenon and sometimes other elements. Though these gases are present "in virtually all meteorites," the Fayetteville meteorite has ~2,000,000 x10−8 ccSTP/g helium, or ~2% helium by volume equivalent. In comparison, background level is a few ppm.

The identification of gas-rich meteorites is based on the presence of light noble gases in large amounts, at levels which cannot be explained without involving an additional component over and above the well-known noble gas components that are present in all meteorites.

History
William Ramsay was the first to report helium in an iron meteorite, in 1895- not long after its first Earth sample, instead of via Solar observation.

The use of decay products to date meteorites was suggested by Bauer in 1947, and explicitly published by Gerling and Pavlova in 1951. However, this soon resulted in wildly varying ages; it was realized excess helium (including helium-3, rare on Earth) was generated by radiation, too.

The first explicit publication of a gas-rich meteorite was Staroe Pesyanoe (often shortened to Pesyanoe), by Gerling and Levskii in 1956. In family with the later Fayetteville, Pesyanoe's helium level is ~1 million x10−8 ccSTP/g.

Reynolds' publication of a "general Xe anomaly", including 129I decay products and more, touched off the subfield of xenology, continuing to today.

The first publication of presolar grains in the 1980s was precipitated by workers searching for noble gases; PSGs were not simply checked via their gas contents.

Lines of inquiry
As unreactive components, they are tracers of processes throughout and predating the Solar System:

Material age can be determined by relative exposure to direct solar and cosmic radiation (by cosmic ray tracks), and indirect creation of resultant nuclides. This includes Ar-Ar dating, I-Xe dating, and U to its various decay products including helium.

The parent body of a meteorite can be traced in part via comparison of trace elements. That meteorites are fragments of asteroids, and conditions on such asteroids, were partially deduced from gas evidence.

This includes meteorite pairing, the re-association of meteorites which had split before recovery.

Meteorite, parent, and Solar System histories are indicated by tracer elements, including thermometry, a record of material temperature.

 Presolar activity.
 A supernova thought to have preceded the Solar System.
 The history of the Sun. This record extends to billion-year timescales, back to "very early in the life of the Sun".
 The history of cosmic ray fluence. Meteorites do not show significant variation of cosmic rays over time.

The Lost City Meteor was tracked, allowing an orbit determination back to the asteroid belt. Measurement of relatively short-half-life isotopes in the subsequent Lost City Meteorite then indicate radiation levels in that region of the Solar System.

Gas study
The field of meteoritic gases follows progress in analytical methods.

The first analyses were basic laboratory chemistry, such as acid dissolution. Various acids were necessary, due to mixtures of various soluble and insoluble minerals. Stepped etching gave higher levels of resolution and discrimination.

Pyrolysis was used, such as on highly acid resistant minerals. These two methods were alternately lauded and derided as "burning the haystack to find the needle."

Meteoritical studies have tracked the progress of mass spectrometry, a continual and rapid progression comparable to or greater than Moore's Law.

More recently, laser extraction

Meteorites 

This meteoritics-related list is incomplete; you can help by expanding it.

Interplanetary dust, like c-chondrites and enstatites, contain hosts for these gases and often measurable gas contents. So too do a fraction of micrometeorites.

Gas
Gas components were first named by descriptors, then letter codes; the letter taxonomy "has become increasingly complicated and confusing with time."

By Element and Isotope 
Primordial/trapped

36A 132Xe

Solar wind/solar flare

4He 20Ne 36Ar

Cosmic ray/spallogenic

3He 83Kr 126Xe

Radiogenic/fissile

3He 36Ar 40Ar 129Xe 132Xe 134Xe 136Xe 128Xe

By Component 
Planetary

"Planetary" gases (P, Q, P1) are depleted in light elements (He, Ne) compared to solar abundances (see below), or conversely, enriched in Kr, Xe. This name originally implied an origin, the gas blend observed in terrestrial planets. Scientists wished to stop implying this, but the habit was retained.

Solar, subsolar

This gas component corresponds to the solar wind. Solar flare gas can be distinguished by its greater depth, and a slightly variant composition. "Subsolar" is intermediary between solar and planetary.

E

"Exotic" neon- aberrant 20Ne/22Ne values.

H

"Heavy" isotopes of xenon, primarily r-process isotopes, plus p-process. Thus, sometimes seen as "HL," anomalous heavy and light isotopes.

G

"Giant", after asymptotic giant branch (while A and B had been taken); contains their s-process isotopes.

See also

 Activated carbon
 Clathrate
 Cryopump
 Getter
 Hydrogen embrittlement
 Ion implantation
 Molecular sieve and Molecular distillation
 Outgassing

References 

 Handbook of Elemental Abundances in Meteorites, Mason, B. ed. 1970 Gordon and Breach New York  Chapter 2: The Noble Gases, Heymann, D., p. 29
 Mazor, E. Heymann, D. Anders, E. Noble gases in carbonaceous chondrites. 1970 Geochimica et Cosmochimica Acta vol. 34 p. 781-824
 Goswami, J. Lal, D. Wilkening, L. Gas-Rich meteorites: Probes for particle environment and dynamical processes in the inner solar system 1983 Space Science Reviews vol. 37 p. 111-59
 The Sun in Time, Sonett, C. Giampapa, M. Mathews, M. eds. 1991 University of Arizona Press Tucson 
 Ozima, M. Podosek, F. Noble Gases in Geochemistry, 2nd ed. 2002 Cambridge University Press Cambridge 
 Noble Gases in Geochemistry and Cosmochemistry, Porcelli, D. Ballentine, C. Wieler, R. eds. 2002 Mineralogical Society of America Washington, DC 
 Treatise on Geochemistry vol.1 2003 1.14 Noble Gases, Podosek, F. p. 381-403
 Meteorites and the Early Solar System II, Lauretta, D. McSween, H. eds. 2006 University of Arizona Press Tucson 
 Geochemical Perspectives Jul 2013 vol. 2 issue 2 Special issue, Noble Gas Constraints on the Origin and Evolution of Earth’s Volatiles ISSN 2223-7755

Meteorite types
Geophysics